Physocyclus globosus, sometimes known as the short-bodied cellar spider is a species of spider belonging to the family Pholcidae. This is a cosmopolitan species, found in caves and buildings throughout the warmer parts of the world.

This is a small brown spider (body length around 6 mm), with a short, broad abdomen. A black line runs along the back of the carapace, continuing along most of the abdomen. The eight eyes are grouped close together on a raised hump on the face.

References

  (2008): The world spider catalog, version 8.5. American Museum of Natural History.

Pholcidae
Cave spiders
Cosmopolitan spiders
Spiders described in 1874